Rocky Beamon (December 10, 1977 – June 10, 2020) was an American serial killer who killed three people, including two fellow inmates in prison. While serving a life sentence for murder, Beamon murdered two inmates, both of whom served time for sex crimes against children. He would profess his hatred for sex offenders, saying that killing them gave him "the best feeling I’ve had in a long time", and that he would continue to kill them unless he was executed. Beamon was sentenced to death but committed suicide on death row in 2020.

Initial murder 
On February 6, 2005, Rocky Beamon and his girlfriend, Karen Wilkins, murdered Debbie Lacey. Beamon hit Lacey, tied her hands behind her back, and held her in water until she drowned. They then took her car and traded it with two men for crack cocaine. The two were arrested after police found the two men driving Lacey's car.

To avoid a possible death sentence, Beamon pleaded guilty to first degree murder and was sentenced to life without parole. During his sentencing hearing, Lacey's family spoke.

"I don't know what to say to somebody who doesn't have a soul," said Barry Grant, Lacey's nephew.

Grant read a letter written by Lacey's daughter, 16-year-old Sara Cash. Cash wrote that she has dreams of her future, but her mother will not be there. "She won't be there when my kids are born," she wrote. "You took that away from me." Lacey's niece, Jill Morris, threw the harshest words at Beamon. "God says we should forgive," Morris said. "I'm not there yet I hate you with every ounce of my soul."

The mother of Beamon's two children, a 7-year-old and a 17-month-old, told Lacey's family she was sorry for what he did but she reminded them that her family also will suffer every day. Beamon's mother likewise expressed her sorrow. Then, she told her son she loved him. As she spoke, Beamon's hands began to shake. His knees buckled slightly, then he took a couple of steps backward. After using a paper towel to wipe his face, he stood straight, folding his hands in front of him. Judge Ronald Ficarrotta sentenced Beamon to life in prison. Turning to Lacey's family, Ficarrotta said he wanted to do more. "I wish there were some wise words I could say to help you with your Outside the courthouse, Shirley Grant, Lacey's sister, said she felt justice was served. She said the family will return to court when it's time for Wilkins to face her charges. "We are here to stand by Debbie," Grant said, "no matter how many times we have to come to court."

Wilkins pleaded guilty to second degree murder and was sentenced to 30 years in prison and 10 years of probation. "When you go to bed at night, I hope you think about the suffering and struggling she went through," said Shirley Grant, while holding a picture of her. "I hope when you wake up it's still on your mind."

Sara Cash told Wilkins that her mother never will get a chance to see her get married and have children of her own. "I have to live with that every day," she said. After the hearing, family members said the two hearings have begun to take a toll on Cash. She has suffered nightmares as the reality of her mother's death sinks in. Barry Grant, Lacey's nephew, said Beamon did the dirty work but Wilkins is just as guilty for going along with it. Mike Wilkins, Karen Wilkins' veil ex-husband, said he considered speaking with Lacey's family after the hearing, but saw how upset they were and didn't want to make matters worse. "My heart goes out to them," he said.

Wilkins is serving her sentence at Lowell Correctional Institution.

Subsequent murders 
On July 5, 2012, Beamon killed a fellow inmate, 44-year-old Brian Hunsicker. Beamon stalked his second victim for days, before attacking him in a prison shower. He choked Hunsicker and stabbed him more than 80 times with a homemade shank. Afterward, he rinsed himself off before flushing the shank, a towel, and a pair of boxers, before proceeding to dinner. In his confession, Beamon had stated that Hunsicker also owed him money.

Hunsicker had been serving six life terms for an attack on a 10-year-old girl in 2001. He broke into her house while she was sleeping and then raped her at knifepoint before fleeing. After he left, the girl ran to her parents' room and told them what happened. Hunsicker was found a few blocks away. Orlando police later found more than 1,000 neatly folded children's garments in Hunsicker's home. They also learned that he'd served time in prison for molesting a 5-year-old girl in 1992. At his sentencing hearing, the judge had called Hunsicker "a parent's worst nightmare".

On January 22, 2017, Beamon killed 27-year-old Nicholas Anderson, who had been serving a 20-year sentence for child molestation. He bound and strangled Anderson before cutting his neck with a homemade weapon.

In May 2018, Beamon wrote a letter to Judge Christopher Patterson in which he said that killing sex offenders "was the best feeling I’ve had in a long time." He pledged to continue targeting victims if he was not sentenced to death. "I’ll do my best to eliminate every single one until one of three things happens: (1) someone kills me, (2) I run out of people to kill, or (3) they put me where I can kill no more, death row," the letter said. He told Judge Patterson "if you don’t send me to death row, I vow to dedicate my next to you." In another letter, Beamon wrote "I will continue to take lives until someone in here takes mine or I reach my goal, death row, so please send me there. If you set me free, it's blood on your hands."

Death 
Beamon committed suicide on death row on June 10, 2020. He was 42 years old.

See also 
 List of serial killers in the United States

References 

1977 births
2020 deaths
2005 murders in the United States
2012 murders in the United States
2017 murders in the United States
American male criminals
American people convicted of murder
American people who died in prison custody
American serial killers
People convicted of murder by Florida
Prisoners sentenced to death by Florida
Male serial killers
Serial killers who committed suicide in prison custody
Suicides in Florida
Vigilantism against sex offenders
Prisoners who died in Florida detention
Volunteer execution